The 13th Legislative Assembly of Ontario was in session from December 11, 1911, until May 29, 1914, just prior to the 1914 general election. The majority party was the Ontario Conservative Party  led by Sir James P. Whitney.

William Henry Hoyle served as speaker for the assembly.

Notes

External links 
Members in Parliament 13 

Terms of the Legislative Assembly of Ontario
1911 establishments in Ontario
1914 disestablishments in Ontario